Beaver Mills may refer to a location in the United States:

Beaver Mills, Alabama, a ghost town
Beaver Mills (Keene, New Hampshire), a registered historic place

See also
Beaver Mill, a mill in North Adams, Massachusetts